In calculus, Newton's method is an iterative method for finding the roots of a differentiable function , which are solutions to the equation . These solutions may be minima, maxima, or saddle points; see section "Several variables" in Critical point (mathematics) and also section "Geometric interpretation" in this article. This is relevant in optimization, which aims to find (global) minima of the function .

Newton's method

The central problem of optimization is minimization of functions. Let us first consider the case of univariate functions, i.e., functions of a single real variable. We will later consider the more general and more practically useful multivariate case.

Given a twice differentiable function , we seek to solve the optimization problem

Since

the minimum is achieved for

Putting everything together, Newton's method performs the iteration

Geometric interpretation

Note that if  happens to  a quadratic function, then the exact extremum is found in one step.

Higher dimensions
The above iterative scheme can be generalized to  dimensions by replacing the derivative with the gradient (different authors use different notation for the gradient, including ), and the reciprocal of the second derivative with the inverse of the Hessian matrix (different authors use different notation for the Hessian, including ).  One thus obtains the iterative scheme

Often Newton's method is modified to include a small step size  instead of :

This is often done to ensure that the Wolfe conditions, or much simpler and efficient Armijo's condition, are satisfied at each step of the method. For step sizes other than 1, the method is often referred to as the relaxed or damped Newton's method.

Convergence

That is,

Computing the Newton direction

Finding the inverse of the Hessian in high dimensions to compute the Newton direction  can be an expensive operation. In such cases, instead of directly inverting the Hessian, it is better to calculate the vector  as the solution to the system of linear equations

which may be solved by various factorizations or approximately (but to great accuracy) using iterative methods. Many of these methods are only applicable to certain types of equations, for example the Cholesky factorization and conjugate gradient will only work if  is a positive definite matrix.

On the other hand, if a constrained optimization is done (for example, with Lagrange multipliers), the problem may become one of saddle point finding, in which case the Hessian will be symmetric indefinite and the solution of  will need to be done with a method that will work for such, such as the  variant of Cholesky factorization or the conjugate residual method.

There also exist various quasi-Newton methods, where an approximation for the Hessian (or its inverse directly) is built up from changes in the gradient.

If the Hessian is close to a non-invertible matrix, the inverted Hessian can be numerically unstable and the solution may diverge. In this case, certain workarounds have been tried in the past, which have varied success with certain problems. One can,  for example, modify the Hessian by adding a correction matrix  so as to make  positive definite.

An approach exploited in the Levenberg–Marquardt algorithm (which uses an approximate Hessian) is to add a scaled identity matrix to the Hessian, with the scale adjusted at every iteration as needed. For large  and small Hessian, the iterations will behave like gradient descent with step size . This results in slower but more reliable convergence where the Hessian doesn't provide useful information.

Some caveats
 
Newton's method, in its original version, has several caveats: 
 
 It does not work if the Hessian is not invertible. This is clear from the very definition of Newton's method, which requires taking the inverse of the Hessian. 
 It may not converge at all, but can enter a cycle having more than 1 point. See the section "Failure analysis" in Newton's method.
 It can converge to a saddle point instead of to a local minimum, see the section "Geometric interpretation" in this article.  
 
The popular modifications of Newton's method, such as quasi-Newton methods or Levenberg-Marquardt algorithm mentioned above, also have caveats: 
 
For example, it is usually required that the cost function is (strongly) convex and the Hessian is globally bounded or Lipschitz continuous, for example this is mentioned in the section "Convergence" in this article. If one looks at the papers by Levenberg and Marquardt in the reference for Levenberg–Marquardt algorithm, which are the original sources for the mentioned method, one can see that there is basically no theoretical analysis in the paper by Levenberg, while the paper by Marquardt only analyses a local situation and does not prove a global convergence result.  One can compare with Backtracking line search method for Gradient descent, which has good theoretical guarantee under more general assumptions, and can be implemented and works well in practical large scale problems such as Deep Neural Networks.

See also

Quasi-Newton method
Gradient descent
Gauss–Newton algorithm
Levenberg–Marquardt algorithm
Trust region
Optimization
Nelder–Mead method

Notes

References

External links
 

Optimization algorithms and methods

fr:Méthode de Newton